Lyons Sandstone is a geological layer formed during the Paleozoic Era, Middle Permian Period about 250 million years ago.  This layer is also referred to as the Lyons Formation.  It is the result of fine-grained quartz sand dunes compressing into sandstone.  This layer is visible along the Front Range of the Colorado Rocky Mountains.

The stone quarried from this layer was used to build many buildings on the University of Colorado - Boulder campus.

References

External links 
 Colorado Mountain Presentation
 Geology of Colorado (Boulder Valley)
 Geologic History of the Boulder Area
 The Horsetooth Quadrangle Virtual Geological Field Trip
 USGS Geolex Database: Lyons
 Roxborough State Park Geology

Permian System of North America
Geology of Colorado